Break Like the Wind is a 1992 album by the fictional heavy metal band Spinal Tap. The songs include a range of genres, from the glam metal anthem "Bitch School" down to the skiffle satire of "All the Way Home". The title, and the album's title track, is a double entendre that combines and confuses the idiom "make like the wind" (also possibly a reference to the Christopher Cross song "Ride Like the Wind", famously covered by British heavy metal band Saxon) with "break wind", a euphemism for flatulence.

Originally, the CD was packaged in an 18-inch "extra-long box", as a satire against the controversial packaging policy of longboxes which was increasingly criticized as unnecessary and wasteful.

The album reached #44 in Canada.

Backstory
In the film This Is Spinal Tap, David St. Hubbins (portrayed by Michael McKean) and Nigel Tufnel (portrayed by Christopher Guest) claim "All the Way Home" is the first song they wrote together, and that six years after it was written, David and Nigel recorded the song in December 1961. The film recounts the two being in different bands, David in the 'Creatures' and Nigel with the 'Lovely Lads'. Similarly, "The Sun Never Sweats" is implied to be the title track from their fictitious album of the same name, whose cover is shown on the packaging of the album This Is Spinal Tap. "Clam Caravan" is apparently a "misspelling" of "Calm Caravan".

Track listing 
All tracks by David St. Hubbins, Nigel Tufnel and Derek Smalls except where noted.

Personnel 
Spinal Tap
 David St. Hubbins (Michael McKean) – lead vocals and guitar
 Nigel Tufnel (Christopher Guest) – lead guitar and vocals, lead vocals on "Springtime" and "Clam Caravan"
 Derek Smalls (Harry Shearer) – bass guitar and vocals
 Ric Shrimpton (R.J. Parnell) – drums and percussion
 C. J. Vanston – keyboards

Additional personnel
 Jeff Beck – guitar on "Break Like the Wind"
 Cher – co-lead vocals on "Just Begin Again"
 Walter Becker – liner notes
 Steve Lukather – guitar on "Just Begin Again" and "Break Like the Wind", piano on "Clam Caravan"
 Joe Satriani – guitar on "Break Like the Wind"
 Slash – guitar on "Break Like the Wind"
 Timothy B. Schmit – background vocals on "Christmas with the Devil" and "Cash On Delivery"
 Tommy Funderburk – background vocals on "Christmas with the Devil" and "Cash On Delivery"
 Waddy Wachtel – slide guitar on "Stinkin' Up the Great Outdoors"
 Dweezil Zappa – guitar solo on "Diva Fever"
 Eric "Stumpy Joe" Childs – drums on "Rainy Day Sun"
 Nicky Hopkins – keyboards on "Rainy Day Sun"
 Luis Conte – percussion on "Clam Caravan"
 David Bianco – Mix Engineer
 Danny Alonso – Mix Assistant
Mixed at Can Am Studios

"Break Like the Wind" samples the classical guitar piece Concierto de Aranjuez by Rodrigo.

Charts

See also 
 Spinal Tap discography

References 

1992 albums
Spinal Tap (band) albums
Albums produced by T Bone Burnett
Albums produced by Dave Jerden
Albums produced by Danny Kortchmar
MCA Records albums